Between August 1998 and September 2008, the Recording Industry Association of Korea (RIAK) and the Music Industry Association of Korea (MIAK) published a monthly record chart, ranking the best-selling CDs and cassettes within South Korea. At least 100 albums and two singles have topped the chart during the course of its existence.

In early 1998, South Korea's National Tax Service decided that the music industry should be more transparent. The Korean Video Record Association decided in a meeting held on July 23, 1998, that record sales should be tracked and released on a monthly basis. The record labels had to submit the sales of an album up to six months after its release. The data had to be submitted until the 7th of every month and was released by the RIAK on the 10th. The Korea Phonogram Association, issued its first two sales reports, compiled by the Korea Video Record Association on September 10, 1998. One listed the best-selling albums between March and August 1998, topped by Seo Taiji's self-titled debut studio album, which sold more than 1.1 million copies. On the other list, Uhm Jung-hwa's Invitation was ranked as the best-selling album of August 1998. It sold more than 187,000 copies.

Number ones

See also

 Gaon Music Chart
 Gaon Album Chart

References

Lists of number-one albums in South Korea